Communauté d'agglomération du Bassin de Bourg-en-Bresse is the communauté d'agglomération, an intercommunal structure, centred on the city of Bourg-en-Bresse. It is located in the Ain department, in the Auvergne-Rhône-Alpes region, eastern France. It was created in January 2017 by the merger of the former Communauté d'agglomération de Bourg-en-Bresse with 6 former communautés de communes. Its seat is in Bourg-en-Bresse. Its area is 1236.8 km2. Its population was 132,380 in 2017, of which 41,527 in Bourg-en-Bresse proper.

Composition
The communauté d'agglomération consists of the following 74 communes:

Attignat
Beaupont
Bény
Béréziat
Bohas-Meyriat-Rignat
Bourg-en-Bresse
Bresse Vallons
Buellas
Certines
Ceyzériat
Cize
Coligny
Confrançon
Cormoz
Corveissiat
Courmangoux
Courtes
Curciat-Dongalon
Curtafond
Dompierre-sur-Veyle
Domsure
Drom
Druillat
Foissiat
Grand-Corent
Hautecourt-Romanèche
Jasseron
Jayat
Journans
Lent
Lescheroux
Malafretaz
Mantenay-Montlin
Marboz
Marsonnas
Meillonnas
Montagnat
Montcet
Montracol
Montrevel-en-Bresse
Nivigne et Suran
Péronnas
Pirajoux
Polliat
Pouillat
Ramasse
Revonnas
Saint-André-sur-Vieux-Jonc
Saint-Denis-lès-Bourg
Saint-Didier-d'Aussiat
Saint-Étienne-du-Bois
Saint-Jean-sur-Reyssouze
Saint-Julien-sur-Reyssouze
Saint-Just
Saint-Martin-du-Mont
Saint-Martin-le-Châtel
Saint-Nizier-le-Bouchoux
Saint-Rémy
Saint-Sulpice
Saint-Trivier-de-Courtes
Salavre
Servas
Servignat
Simandre-sur-Suran
Tossiat
La Tranclière
Val-Revermont
Vandeins
Verjon
Vernoux
Vescours
Villemotier
Villereversure
Viriat

References

Bourg-en-Bresse
Bourg-en-Bresse